Ávine Júnior Cardoso or simply Ávine (born February 21, 1988 in Aimorés) is a Brazilian footballer, who plays  Bahia.

Honours
Bahia
Campeonato Baiano: 2012

References

External links

1988 births
Living people
Brazilian footballers
Esporte Clube Bahia players
Campeonato Brasileiro Série A players
Association football defenders